The Bull River in Montana is a tributary of the Clark Fork River, west of the Continental Divide. The River's discharge is 389 cubic feet per second.

References 

Rivers of Montana